Nabil Kebbab (born 30 December 1983) is an Algerian swimmer who competes in the freestyle events. He won the bronze medal in the men's 100 m freestyle event at the 2005 Mediterranean Games, and represented his native African country at the 2008 Summer Olympics and 2012 Summer Olympics.

References
 NBC Olympics
 

1983 births
Living people
Algerian male freestyle swimmers
Swimmers at the 2008 Summer Olympics
Swimmers at the 2012 Summer Olympics
Olympic swimmers of Algeria
Sportspeople from Tizi Ouzou
Mediterranean Games bronze medalists for Algeria
Swimmers at the 2005 Mediterranean Games
Swimmers at the 2009 Mediterranean Games
African Games gold medalists for Algeria
African Games medalists in swimming
African Games silver medalists for Algeria
African Games bronze medalists for Algeria
Mediterranean Games medalists in swimming
Competitors at the 2007 All-Africa Games
Competitors at the 2011 All-Africa Games
21st-century Algerian people